The 1989 Mexican Grand Prix was a Formula One motor race held at the Autódromo Hermanos Rodríguez, Mexico City on 28 May 1989. The race, contested over 69 laps, was the fourth race of the 1989 Formula One season and was won from pole position by Ayrton Senna, driving a McLaren-Honda, with Riccardo Patrese second in a Williams-Renault and Michele Alboreto third in a Tyrrell-Ford.

Qualifying

Pre-qualifying report
The Friday morning pre-qualifying session produced another 1–2 for the Brabham team, their third of the four Grands Prix so far. This time Martin Brundle was fastest ahead of Stefano Modena, with the Dallara of Alex Caffi pre-qualifying in third. The fourth-placed driver was Stefan Johansson in the Onyx, who went through to the main qualifying sessions for the first time this season, at the expense of his team-mate Bertrand Gachot, who was fifth fastest.

Although failing to pre-qualify, Gregor Foitek had one of his better sessions, finishing sixth fastest in the sole EuroBrun, ahead of the Osella of Nicola Larini, who suffered a fuel pump issue. Larini had been lined up to replace Gerhard Berger at Ferrari had the Austrian not been fit to return to the cockpit after his Imola accident. Volker Weidler was eighth in the Rial, also one of his better performances of the season despite having gearing problems. Next were the two Zakspeeds of Bernd Schneider and Aguri Suzuki, and the other Osella, driven by Piercarlo Ghinzani. Ghinzani was excluded anyway after ignoring a weight check signal. At the bottom of the time sheets were Joachim Winkelhock in the AGS, and lastly Pierre-Henri Raphanel, who did not post a representative lap time in the Coloni FC188B after his strong performance in the last race at Monaco. Coloni had only brought three mechanics and one car for both Raphanel and Roberto Moreno, while waiting for their new C3 to be built, making a token effort to qualify in order to comply with the regulations and avoid a fine.

Pre-qualifying classification

Qualifying report
In qualifying proper, World Champion Ayrton Senna scored his 33rd career pole position, equalling the long-standing record held by Jim Clark. Senna's pole time in his McLaren-Honda was 0.408 slower than his pole time in 1988 in the turbocharged McLaren MP4/4. His McLaren teammate Alain Prost was second fastest with the Ferrari 640 of Nigel Mansell third. Mansell's teammate Gerhard Berger, returning to action in Mexico after his crash at San Marino, was sixth, the Ferraris split by the March-Judd of Ivan Capelli and the Williams-Renault of Riccardo Patrese. Surprisingly, Capelli's teammate Maurício Gugelmin failed to qualify. Berger, still suffering the effects of his crash, admitted that if not for Ferrari's innovative semi-automatic transmission (which meant he did not have to change gears as with a normal stick shift), he would not have been able to race.

The back row of the grid was arguably the best credentialed and most experienced in Grand Prix history, consisting of seven-time winner René Arnoux in the Ligier-Ford and triple World Champion Nelson Piquet in the Lotus-Judd.

Qualifying classification

Race

Race report
Senna chose medium compound Goodyear "B" tyres for the race while Prost went for the softer C-compound tyres in the hopes of gaining a speed advantage. Despite the pole being on the dirty side of the track in Mexico, Senna made a better start and was able to lead into the first turn from Mansell, Prost, Berger, Patrese and the Tyrrell-Ford of Michele Alboreto. However, it all meant nothing as Modena spun his Brabham into the Peraltada on the first lap and was tapped by the Ligier of Olivier Grouillard and finished against the tyre wall. Despite the car not being in a dangerous position, the red flag was shown and the race had to be restarted.

Senna won the restart and led Prost, a fast starting Berger, Mansell and the Williams pair of Patrese and Thierry Boutsen. Prost, with his softer tyres giving him better grip, soon moved onto the back of his teammate's car. However, Mexico would be where Prost started questioning the power of his Honda V10 compared to the ones used by Senna. For a number of laps Prost, clearly faster through the final Peraltada curve coming onto the main straight, could not make an impression on Senna despite being in his aerodynamic tow on the 1.2 km long main straight. Indeed, the #1 McLaren was seen to pull away from the #2 car on the straight. Running close to his teammate eventually had a detrimental effect on Prost's tyres and he was soon into the pits for a change of rubber. The McLaren team then mistakenly gave the Frenchman another set of "C" tyres rather than the "B"s he had come in for. Prost was soon back in for another tyre change and went back into the race only seconds in front of Senna who now had nearly a lap lead over his closest championship rival. Despite being on far fresher tyres than his teammate, Prost still lost ground to Senna and was eventually lapped when the Brazilian swept past on the main straight, fuelling Prost's claims that his engines were down on power compared to Senna's. McLaren team boss Ron Dennis later publicly apologised to Prost for the error in his pit stop.

Both Ferraris ran well until Berger's race ended on lap 16 with transmission failure while Mansell's gearbox lasted until lap 43. This left the Williams of Patrese in second place with Alboreto a surprising third. This was how the top three finished with Alessandro Nannini fourth in his Benetton B188. The Benetton team had hoped to have their new B189 available in Mexico, but ongoing problems with the new Ford HB engine meant the team had to continue using their 1988 car and engines. Prost, having unlapped himself, finished fifth to be the last car on the lead lap, while Italian Gabriele Tarquini scored the final point for sixth in his AGS-Ford, which proved to be his only point in Formula One.

Race classification

Championship standings after the race

Drivers' Championship standings

Constructors' Championship standings

 Note: Only the top five positions are included for both sets of standings.

References

Mexican Grand Prix
Mexican Grand Prix
Grand Prix
May 1989 sports events in Mexico